The BC Liquor Distribution Branch (BCLDB) is the governmental body responsible for distributing alcohol and cannabis products in the Canadian province of British Columbia. The BCLDB operates under the Ministry of Finance and was established in 1921. The BCLDB head office is located in Burnaby, with distribution centres in Delta and Kamloops.

The BCLDB is the only organization allowed to purchase, import, and distribute alcoholic beverages in British Columbia. They employ more than 4,200 people, and operate over 230 liquor and cannabis stores (as of March 2023) under the BC Liquor Stores and BC Cannabis Stores names, found all across the province. The other governmental body which is responsible for regulating and monitoring the industry is the Liquor and Cannabis Regulation Branch (LCRB).

Retail

BC Liquor Stores

As of October 2018, the BCLDB operates 197 liquor stores.

BC Cannabis Stores

On December 5, 2017, the BC provincial government determined that the BC Liquor Distribution Branch would be the sole distributor of non-medical cannabis. On October 17, 2018, the day that the Cannabis Act took effect, the first cannabis store opened in Kamloops. An online store also operates allowing consumers to purchase cannabis products online which is delivered by mail.

See also
Société des alcools du Québec
Liquor Control Board of Ontario
Alberta Gaming and Liquor Commission
Saskatchewan Liquor and Gaming Authority
Manitoba Liquor Control Commission

References

External links
 BC Liquor Distribution Branch 

Canadian provincial alcohol departments and agencies
Crown corporations of British Columbia
Alcohol in British Columbia
Alcohol monopolies
Alcohol distribution retailers of Canada
Companies based in Burnaby
Cannabis regulatory agencies